Lachesilla dimorpha is a species of Psocoptera from the Lachesillidae family that can be found in Cyprus, Greece, Italy, and Spain. It can also be found in Near East and North Africa.

References

Lachesillidae
Insects described in 1981
Psocoptera of Europe